On December 4, 2015, a molotov cocktail was thrown into the El Sayad restaurant in Cairo, Egypt. The resultant fire killed 17 people, and wounded six. The restaurant was also a nightclub and was located in the Agouza district of the city.

The restaurant was located in a basement and had no fire exits.

Investigation

The prime perpetrators were two young men who were denied entry by the club's security personnel at the door on Thursday night. The duo with the aid of two others then came back at 6:00 a.m. on Friday to the restaurant & bar, named Al-Sayyad, with a Molotov cocktail. They picked a fight with door security and then threw the firebomb inside the club before fleeing the scene. All victims, 12 men and 5 women, were employees of the club. Investigations revealed that the emergency exit door was locked with chains, contributing to the high death toll. On 16 January 2016, Cairo prosecutors charged all four suspects with murder in relation to the arson attack.

References

2015 murders in Egypt
2015 fires in Africa
Fires in Egypt
2010s in Cairo
Attacks on nightclubs
Attacks on restaurants in Africa
Mass murder in 2015
Mass murder in Egypt
December 2015 events in Africa
Nightclub fires
December 2015 crimes in Africa
Fire disasters involving barricaded escape routes